All lists and statistics of the Arab League

Economic Lists

Financing
GDP

External Debt

Industrial Growth Rate

Oil

Production

Demographic Lists

Population

Cities

Languages

Religions

Ethnicities

Arab world-related lists